Pugilism may refer to:

 Boxing, a combat sport 
 Bare-knuckle boxing, a combat sport without any boxing gloves
 Ancient Greek boxing
 Russian boxing, traditional bare-knuckle boxing of Russia

See also
Punch (combat)